Looney Tunes Super Stars' Bugs Bunny: Wascally Wabbit is a DVD of 15 Bugs Bunny cartoons that was released on May 4, 2011 (in Region 2 and 4). Like the Sylvester & Tweety: Feline Fwenzy disc, this disc features 15 cartoons that were previously on the Golden Collection sets as the new plan for the Super Stars volumes is one with new-to-DVD cartoons and one with previously-on-DVD cartoons. The reason for the double-dip release in each wave is so the Warner Home Video department can pay back for the remastering of other restorations. Also, unlike the previous Super Stars discs, the cartoons are presented in original fullscreen.

Contents 
 All cartoons on this disc star Bugs Bunny.

Notes 
 In the Region 2 release, "Rabbit Fire", "Baton Bunny", "Rabbit of Seville" and "Big Top Bunny" are replaced respectively by "Buckaroo Bugs", "Hurdy-Gurdy Hare", "Hare Tonic" and "Acrobatty Bunny". These shorts too were already released in the Golden Collection series.
 This is the only Looney Tunes Super Stars DVD set that is unavailable in Region 1, instead it is only available in Regions 2 and 4.

References 

Looney Tunes home video releases